In baseball statistics, a pitcher is credited with a game started (denoted by GS) if he is the first pitcher to pitch for his team in a game.

Cy Young holds the Major League Baseball games started record with 815. Young is the only pitcher in MLB history to start more than 800 career games. Nolan Ryan (773), Don Sutton (756), Greg Maddux (740), Phil Niekro (716), Steve Carlton (709), Roger Clemens (707), and Tommy John (700) are the only other pitchers to have started 700 or more games their career.

Key

List

Stats updated as of the end of the 2022 season.

Notes

References

External links

Games s
Major League Baseball statistics